Ruth Eleanor March  is a British genomic scientist who is Senior Vice President of Precision Medicine at AstraZeneca. She specialises in precision medicine and oncology. During the COVID-19 pandemic, March developed a diagnostic test for COVID-19.

Early life and education 
March started her scientific career at the London Hospital Medical College. She was a graduate student at the University of London, where she studied immunology. In particular, she studied the properties of rheumatoid anti globulins and their role in the pathogenesis of rheumatoid arthritis. After earning her doctorate, she joined the Medical Research Council Immunochemistry Unit at the University of Oxford where she trained in genomic science and gene mapping. Her research contributed to the first genome-wide single-nucleotide polymorphism analysis of a biomarker to be submitted to the Food and Drug Administration. In 1997, she moved to Brunel University London, where she spent a year as a university lecturer.

Research and career 
In 1998, March joined AstraZeneca as a principal scientist in pharmacogenomics. She initiated the AstraZeneca genomics initiative, and became interested in personalised healthcare. She argued that this approach would lead to more predictable outcomes for patients. She worked on the expansion of precision medicine AstraZeneca, which now accounts for over ninety per cent of AstraZeneca's effort in clinical therapeutics. These efforts have transformed the drug development process. Before AstraZeneca starts clinical trials, March investigates biomarkers for particular drugs. This biomarker can then be used to select patients for clinical trials.

March is part of the AstraZeneca research and development team for oncology. She is also interested in innovations in diagnostics, and developed several industry firsts in the diagnosis of inflammation and BRCA mutations.

In 2014, March partnered with Roche and Qiagen to create tests based on circulating tumor DNA (ctDNA). These tests can isolate specific signals from the background of DNA noise. They can be used to identify small quantities of the tumour DNA when it is circulating in the blood of cancer patients. She was elected Fellow of the Academy of Medical Sciences in 2019. In 2021, she announced a partnership with Thermo Fisher Scientific to develop next-generation sequencing -based companion diagnostics.

In the early days of the COVID-19 pandemic, March started working on a diagnostic test for COVID-19. She was appointed Officer of the Order of the British Empire (OBE) in the 2022 New Year Honours for services to UK science and the Covid-19 response.

Selected publications

References 

Year of birth missing (living people)
Living people
Place of birth missing (living people)
Officers of the Order of the British Empire
Fellows of the Academy of Medical Sciences (United Kingdom)
Alumni of Barts and The London School of Medicine and Dentistry
Alumni of the University of London
People associated with the University of Oxford
Academics of Brunel University London
AstraZeneca people